Koufana Francois (often erroneously reported as Francois Koufana) is a Cameroonian professional football player. He plays for Union Douala.

References

1986 births
Algerian Ligue Professionnelle 1 players
Cameroonian footballers
Les Astres players
Cameroonian expatriate footballers
Cameroonian expatriate sportspeople in Tunisia
Expatriate footballers in Tunisia
Cameroonian expatriate sportspeople in Libya
Expatriate footballers in Libya
Cameroonian expatriate sportspeople in Algeria
Expatriate footballers in Algeria
Living people
Étoile Sportive du Sahel players
CA Batna players
Union Douala players
Cameroon under-20 international footballers
Association football central defenders